Qazi may refer to:

Places

Iran 
 Qazi Qushchi
 Qazi, Gifan

See also 
 Kazi (disambiguation)
 Kasi (disambiguation)
 Gazi (disambiguation)